Pale Blood is a 1990 direct-to-video vampire film directed by V.V. Dachin Hsu and Michael W. Leighton. It was written by Hsu and Takashi Matsuoka, and produced by Omar Kaczmarczyk and Leighton. The film starred George Chakiris, Wings Hauser and Pamela Ludwig, and featured music and performance by the punk rock band Agent Orange.

Plot
Michael Fury (Chakiris) arrives in Los Angeles to investigate a series of mysterious high-profile murders where the victims have been completely drained of blood. Aiding him in his quest is Lori (Ludwig), a junior member at an investigative firm who is obsessed with the occult. Unbeknownst to her, Fury is himself a vampire. Yet, unbeknownst to Fury, Lori has been keeping a little surprise hidden too.

Cast
George Chakiris as Michael Fury
Wings Hauser as Van Vandameer 
Pamela Ludwig as Lori 
Diana Frank as Jenny 
Darcy DeMoss as Cherry
Earl Garnes as Harker 
Frazer Smith as Frazer Kelly 
Michael Palm as Lead Singer in Band 
Agent Orange as Band 
Steven Bramble as Lori's Date 
Randy Almazon, Frank Barajas, Sheryl Bence, Wanda Blunt, Den Daniel, Jr., Marc Leighton, Michaele Leighton, Michael Shane Leighton, Michael Rosen, Rita M. Saiz, Lindsay Santos and Tom Sidell as People of the Night

Production
Pale Blood was filmed in Hong Kong.

Release
It was released by Noble Entertainment Group in October 1990, and was also known as A Marca do Vampiro in Brazil. Pale Blood was released on VHS by IMV in Germany in 1990, and by RCA/Columbia Pictures Home Video in the US in 1992. Vinegar Syndrome released Pale Blood in April 2020 on Blu Ray and DVD.

Reception
The film received a B− score from Entertainment Weekly, which praised the film for doing "something new with the vampire genre." TV Guide said, "Pale Blood positively aches to do something original with the lore of the undead. But the film never overcomes a serious anemia of good ideas and ways to handle them''.

References

External links 
 

American vampire films
1990 horror films
1990 films
1990s English-language films
1990s American films